Jin Qeshlaqi may refer to:
 Jin Qeshlaqi, Ardabil
 Jin Qeshlaqi, East Azerbaijan